Upright Citizens Brigade is an American sketch comedy television series. It premiered on August 19, 1998 on Comedy Central, with three seasons of ten episodes each. It features four members of Upright Citizens Brigade, an improvisational sketch comedy group. The cast includes Matt Besser, Amy Poehler, Ian Roberts, and Matt Walsh. The cast later reunited for another series called The UCB Show, of a similar format that premiered in 2016 on Seeso.

Episodes

Season 1 (1998)

Season 2 (1999)

Season 3 (2000)

References

External links
 
 

Comedy Central original programming
1990s American sketch comedy television series
2000s American sketch comedy television series
Television series created by Amy Poehler
1998 American television series debuts
2000 American television series endings
English-language television shows
Improvisational television series